The Town of Claremont is a local government area in Perth, Western Australia. Claremont was originally established on 17 June 1898 as the Municipality of Claremont with a mayor and councillors under the Municipal Institutions Act 1876. With the passage of the Local Government Act 1960, it became the Town of Claremont effective 1 July 1961.

Municipality of Claremont

Town of Claremont

References

Lists of local government leaders in Western Australia
Town of Claremont